Area codes 812 and 930 are telephone area codes in the North American Numbering Plan (NANP) for the southern third of the state of Indiana.

The numbering plan area (NPA) includes Evansville and most of its suburbs, the Indiana portions of the Louisville and Cincinnati metropolitan areas, and the cities of Bedford, Bloomington, Columbus, Greensburg, Jasper, Princeton,  Seymour, Terre Haute, and Vincennes. The NPA also serves a small section of Kentucky located adjacent to Evansville and north of the Ohio River whose most notable landmark is Ellis Park Race Course, a Thoroughbred horse racing track.

History
In 1947, American Telephone and Telegraph (AT&T) published the first configuration of proposed numbering plan areas (NPAs) for a new nationwide numbering and toll call routing system. Indiana was divided to receive two area codes. Area code 317 served the northern two-thirds of Indiana, while area code 812 served the southern third. 

Despite the presence of Evansville, Terre Haute and Bloomington, southern Indiana is not as densely populated as the rest of the state. As a result, this configuration remained in place for more than six decades, making 812 one of the few original area codes (not counting those covering an entire state) that still had its original boundaries.

On July 31, 2013, it was announced that 812 would be overlaid with area code 930, the state's first overlay. The move came because 812 was expected to exhaust in 2015. The number shortage was exacerbated by the proliferation of cell phones, particularly in Evansville and the Louisville and Cincinnati suburbs. On March 1, 2014, a six-month permissive dialing period began, during which it was possible to complete calls within the 812 area with both seven and ten digits.

Mandatory ten-digit dialing was originally planned for September 6, 2014 with the first 930 numbers to become available in October. However, in August, the Indiana Utility Regulatory Commission delayed the implementation of mandatory ten-digit dialing until February 7, 2015, and the assignments of the first 930 numbers until March 7 to provide law enforcement and emergency medical services more time to update their telecommunication equipment.

Service area
Counties (partial)

 Brown
 Clay
 Decatur
 Franklin
 Henderson (Kentucky)
 Johnson
 Monroe
 Owen
 Rush
 Shelby
 Vigo

Counties (entirely)

 Bartholomew
 Clark
 Crawford
 Daviess
 Dearborn
 Dubois
 Floyd
 Gibson
 Greene
 Harrison
 Jackson
 Jefferson
 Jennings
 Knox
 Lawrence
 Martin
 Ohio
 Orange
 Perry
 Pike
 Posey
 Ripley
 Scott
 Spencer
 Sullivan
 Switzerland
 Vanderburgh
 Warrick
 Washington

Communities

Austin
Aurora
Batesville
Bedford
Bicknell
Bloomfield
Bloomington
Boonville
Brazil
Chandler
Charlestown
Chrisney
Clarksville
Columbus
Corydon
Crandall
Dale
Depauw
Darmstadt
Edinburgh
Elizabeth
Ellettsville
English
Evansville
Farmersburg
Ferdinand
Fort Branch
Fredericksburg
Georgetown
Greensburg
Hardinsburg
Hatfield
Haubstadt
Huntingburg
Jasonville
Jasper
Jeffersonville
Lawrenceburg
Leavenworth
Lincoln City
Linton
Loogootee
Madison
Marengo
Mauckport
Milan
Millhousen
Milltown
Mitchell
Morgantown
Mount Vernon
Nashville
New Albany
New Harmony
New Salisbury
Newburgh
North Vernon
Oakland City
Orleans
Owensville
Paoli
Palmyra
Patoka
Petersburg
Poseyville
Princeton
Ramsey
Reo
Richland
Rising Sun
Rockport
Salem
Santa Claus
Scottsburg
Sellersburg
Seymour
Shoals
Sullivan
Taswell
Tell City
Terre Haute
Vevay
Vincennes
Washington
Worthington
Westport
Yankeetown

See also

List of NANP area codes
 List of Indiana area codes

References

External links

 List of exchanges from AreaCodeDownload.com, 812 Area Code

812
812
Southwestern Indiana
Telecommunications-related introductions in 1947
1947 establishments in Indiana
2015 establishments in Indiana